Kostanjevica is a village in the Municipality of Šentrupert in southeastern Slovenia. It is a dispersed settlement in the hills north of Šentrupert in the historical region of Lower Carniola. The municipality is now included in the Southeast Slovenia Statistical Region.

References

External links
Kostanjevica at Geopedia

Populated places in the Municipality of Šentrupert